

Acts of the Northern Ireland Assembly

|-
| {{|Financial Assistance Act (Northern Ireland) 2009|ania|2|04-02-2009|maintained=y|archived=n|An Act to enable the making by Northern Ireland departments of schemes for financial assistance in certain circumstances.}}
|-
| {{|Public Authorities (Reform) Act (Northern Ireland) 2009|ania|3|16-02-2009|maintained=y|archived=n|An Act to make provision for, or in connection with, the abolition of certain public authorities.}}
|-
| {{|Building Regulations (Amendment) Act (Northern Ireland) 2009|ania|4|02-03-2009|maintained=y|archived=n|An Act to amend the Building Regulations (Northern Ireland) Order 1979.}}
|-
| {{|Budget Act (Northern Ireland) 2009|ania|5|06-03-2009|maintained=y|archived=n|An Act to authorise the issue out of the Consolidated Fund of certain sums for the service of the years ending 31st March 2009 and 2010; to appropriate those sums for specified purposes; to authorise the Department of Finance and Personnel to borrow on the credit of the appropriated sums; to authorise the use for the public service of certain resources for the years ending 31st March 2009 and 2010; and to revise the limits on the use of certain accruing resources in the year ending 31st March 2009.}}
|-
| {{|Presumption of Death Act (Northern Ireland) 2009|ania|6|02-07-2009|maintained=y|archived=n|An Act to make provision in relation to the presumed deaths of missing persons; and for connected purposes.}}
|-
| {{|Budget (No. 2) Act (Northern Ireland) 2009|ania|7|08-07-2009|maintained=y|archived=n|An Act to authorise the issue out of the Consolidated Fund of certain sums for the service of the year ending 31st March 2010; to appropriate those sums for specified purposes; to authorise the Department of Finance and Personnel to borrow on the credit of the appropriated sums; to authorise the use for the public service of certain resources (including accruing resources) for the year ending 31st March 2010; and to repeal certain spent provisions.}}
|-
| {{|Rates (Amendment) Act (Northern Ireland) 2009|ania|8|03-11-2009|maintained=y|archived=n|An Act to amend the Rates (Northern Ireland) Order 1977; to make provision relating to the sharing of certain social security information with the Department of Finance and Personnel and others; and to confer a temporary power to make grants to district councils.}}
|-
| {{|Financial Provisions Act (Northern Ireland) 2009|ania|9|15-12-2009|maintained=y|archived=n|An Act to confer absolute privilege on certain reports of the Comptroller and Auditor General for Northern Ireland; to enable the Department of Enterprise, Trade and Investment to incur expenditure for certain purposes; to enable the Office of the First Minister and deputy First Minister to incur expenditure for certain purposes; and to repeal the requirement on the Department of Finance and Personnel to prepare Finance Accounts.}}
}}

References

2009